Just an Ordinary Love Story is a 2012 South Korean four-episode television series starring Yoo Da-in and Yeon Woo-jin. It aired from 29 February to 8 March 2012 on Wednesdays and Thursdays at 21:55 as part of Drama Special Series, a weekly program on KBS2 showing multiple episodes short dramas, with each story having a different cast, director, and writer.

Synopsis 
Han Jae-kwang (Yeon Woo-jin) returns to Jeonju where his older brother was murdered seven years ago. On the pretext of a job assignment, he approaches Kim Yoon-hye (Yoo Da-in) for a site tour. Although he knows she is the daughter of the murderer who killed his brother, he could not hate her. Jae-kwang felt her pain when Yoon-hye first realized her father is the murderer. Now, 7 years later, he sees that she still carry the same pain with her. Yoon-hye believes her father is not the murderer while Jae-kwang thinks someone else could have killed his brother. Together, they investigate the case and become close to each other. Will they find the real culprit? Will the barrier between them be removed?

Cast 
Yoo Da-in as Kim Yoon-hye
Moon Ga-young as young Yoon-hye
Yeon Woo-jin as Han Jae-kwang
Cho Yoon-woo as young Jae-kwang
Kim Mi-kyung as Mrs. Shin
Lee Joo-sil as Yoon-hye's paternal grandmother
Lee Sung-min as Kim Joo-pyeong
Choi Min as Kwon Dae-woong
Shin Dong-mi as Kyeong-ja, Kang Mok-soo's ex-wife
Kim Young-jae as Kang Mok-soo
Kwon Yul as Han Jae-min

Awards and nominations

References

External links 
 
 

2012 South Korean television series debuts
Korean Broadcasting System television dramas
Korean-language television shows